Leleuporites is a genus of beetles in the family Carabidae, containing the following species:

 Leleuporites basilewskyi Straneo, 1960
 Leleuporites mirus (Straneo, 1960)

References

Pterostichinae